Prince Jerzy Aleksander Lubomirski (died 1735) was a Polish noble (szlachcic).

Jerzy was Camp Leader of the Crown since 1703, voivode of Sandomierz Voivodship since 1729 and starost of Nowy Sącz.

Ancestry

References 

17th-century births
1735 deaths
Jerzy Aleksander Lubomirski